Jack Pancott (1 April 1933 – 10 September 2015) was a British gymnast. He competed at the 1960 Summer Olympics and the 1964 Summer Olympics.

References

External links
 

1933 births
2015 deaths
British male artistic gymnasts
Olympic gymnasts of Great Britain
Gymnasts at the 1960 Summer Olympics
Gymnasts at the 1964 Summer Olympics
People from Farnborough, Hampshire